This is a list of countries by age at first marriage. This list is current from contemporary surveys and does not treat the topic in history. Currency of information varies by country. 
Because the age distribution of people at first marriage is skewed with a longer tail towards older ages, the majority of people marry before the average age of first marriage. The median age is a more precise representation of when the majority of people marry; for most reporting sources, however, only the average age at marriage is reported.

Africa

Americas

Asia

Europe

Oceania
Note: the reported age for these countries is the median, not the mean (average). All countries in italics have their data in the mean and not the median.

See also
 Age of consent
 Marriageable age

Notes

References

External links
 United Nations World Marriage Patterns 2000 (archived from the original on 25 December 2003)
 Age at first marriage: interactive data visualizations

Marriage age
Fertility
Lists of countries by population-related issue